Rugby sevens at the 2013 World Games was held from August 1 to August 2. Eight teams competed in the rugby sevens tournament held at the Estadio Olímpico Pascual Guerrero in Cali as part of the ninth World Games. South Africa won the gold medal, defeating silver medalists Argentina in the final by 33–24. Canada took the bronze medal, defeating France 33–21 in the play-off for third place. This was the last appearance of rugby sevens at the World Games due to the sport's inclusion in the Olympics.

Teams
8 teams competed in this tournament:

Pools

Pool A

Pool B

Knockout round 
Results of the final phase.

Main tournament

Classification

See also
 Rugby sevens at the World Games
 
 Rugby sevens at the Summer Olympics

References

Rugby sevens
2013
2013 rugby sevens competitions
International rugby union competitions hosted by Colombia
Rugby sevens competitions in South America